Monksville or Monks was a small settlement located in West Milford that was demolished and flooded to create the Monksville Reservoir in Passaic County, New Jersey, United States. The village was the home of James Monks, grand-uncle of Charles A. Monks of Passaic County, New Jersey.

The Monks family had come to the United States around the time of the American Revolution and deeded their property in Monksville to the North Jersey Water District Supply Commission in 1928. As part of the construction of the reservoir in the early 1980s, the Monks Cemetery was relocated, including the burial sites of 15 members of the Monks family and another 15 unidentified remains.

References

Further reading
Cohen, David Steven. The Ramapo Mountain People, Rutgers University Press, 1974, page 79

External links
 Monksville Reservoir
 Monksville Reservoir Photos of paddling on Monksville Reservoir in October, 2005

Ghost towns in New Jersey
Geography of Passaic County, New Jersey
Ringwood, New Jersey